Llewellyn Starks (born February 10, 1967) is a retired male long jumper who competed for the  United States in the 1980s and early-1990s. He was a silver medalist at the Pan American Games in 1991, and a bronze medalist at the US National Championships in 1989 and 1990. He set his personal best of 8.50 metres on July 7, 1991 at a meet in Rhede, Germany. Starks' career came to a shocking end when he suffered a compound fracture to his right leg during a jump at the 1992 New York Games.

Starks won the long jump event at the 1990 NCAA Outdoor Track and Field Championship, setting a school record of 8.24 m for the Louisiana State University Tigers.

Starks is a 1985 graduate of Jonesboro-Hodge High School in Jonesboro, Louisiana. He was also a  member of the Louisiana State University track and field team.

Starks was coached by Dan Pfaff, who also coached Donovan Bailey and Obadele Thompson among others.

Achievements

References

Profile

External links

Image of fracture in 1992

1967 births
Living people
American male long jumpers
Athletes (track and field) at the 1991 Pan American Games
LSU Tigers track and field athletes
Pan American Games medalists in athletics (track and field)
Pan American Games silver medalists for the United States
Universiade medalists in athletics (track and field)
Universiade bronze medalists for the United States
Medalists at the 1989 Summer Universiade
Medalists at the 1991 Pan American Games